Budapest Fashion Week is a fashion week trade show held annually in April and October in Budapest, Hungary, usually after the five major fashion weeks. It is still aspiring to the level of big five fashion weeks (New York City, London, Paris, Milan and Berlin). Based on the concept of the international fashion week series, TONI&GUY Fashion Week Budapest is an event, where the leading Hungarian fashion designers and international designers gain platform to introduce their seasonal collections twice a year for the Hungarian and international fashion industry and the public as well. The event is usually held in the Palazzo Dorottya.

Location 
The Spring-Summer 2019 edition of Budapest Fashion Week was hosted at the Várkert Bazár in the capital of Budapest.

Purpose and organizer

Budapest Fashion Week's aim is to get together the talented young fashion designers with the innovative brands for a successful and most “talked about” event for communication and socially responsible purposes. Based on the concept of the international fashion week series, TONI&GUY Fashion Week Budapest is an event, where the leading Hungarian fashion designers gain platform to introduce their seasonal collections twice a year for the Hungarian and international fashion industry and the public as well. The long-term goal of the event is to build a position for the Hungarian designers on the local and also on the international markets and to revive Hungarian fashion and textile industry.

The organizer of this event is BigBag PR Agency, which is a boutique strategic communications firm specializes in fashion and beauty. Based on industry experiences – with a background in fashion journalism – the agency develop programs that launch, grow, or re-establish brand's presence and deliver consistent brand message. The agency's aim is to reinvigorate the professional Hungarian fashion life, that is why the organizers created TONI&GUY Fashion Week Budapest.

Budapest Fashion Week is not limited to Hungarian designers alone. Labels from other central European countries including Poland, Czech Republic, Romania, and Ukraine are also featured. These designers are working to change the way Budapest fashion is perceived by incorporating unique color palettes, fabrics, and silhouettes.

Sandra Sandor has reached a higher popularity status than most other designers featured in Budapest Fashion Week. Sandor developed her brand named Nanushka in 2005, immediately after graduating from the London College of Fashion. Sandor is known for her knit sweaters, satin dresses with tie-waist details, striped linen pants, vegan leather puffers and belt bags. For each collection she chooses a clashing culture theme. For example, her Spring 2018 collection represents a mix of “far Eastern culture and wild Western Americana” .

Nanushka's bold pieces made from luxurious fabrics and sold at a contemporary price point set this brand aside from most. It has gained global recognition, now being sold to Net-a-Porter, MyTheresa, Nordstrom, and Moda Operandi. World-famous fashion models Gigi Hadid and Caroline de Maigret have been caught wearing staple Nanushka pieces. This brand has been featured twice in New York Fashion Week and there are plans to open stores in New York and LA in the coming years. Through Sandor's hard work and increased popularity, she is helping to establish Budapest as the latest fashion hub.

Thoughts from Vogue

Reception

Live video stream
Budapest Fashion Week became one of the first fashion weeks to fully embrace digital media when it offered all designers who were showing their collections on the catwalk the opportunity to broadcast their shows live on the internet by UStream. The video stream can be seen on Budapest Fashion Week's website and on UStream channels.

The full live stream is no longer available on UStream but short clips can be found on YouTube.

Sponsors
The general sponsor of the event is TONI&GUY global hairdressing and training business company, and further major sponsors are Mercedes-Benz, Samsung, MAC Cosmetics, Sony, and UPC among others.

See also
New York Fashion Week
Berlin Fashion Week
Milan Fashion Week
Paris Fashion Week
London Fashion Week

References

External links
 Budapest Fashion Week official website
 Budapest Fashion Week official channel on YouTube

Recurring events with year of establishment missing
April events
October events
Events in Budapest
Fashion events in Hungary
Annual events in Hungary
Spring (season) events in Hungary
Fashion weeks